Tapping is a term used in a variety of games, generally referring either to the physical action of touching something, or to the "using up" of the resources of some element of the game.

Card and board games
In collectible card games such as Magic: The Gathering to tap a card means to use it so that it cannot be used again in that player's turn. The visual indication of the tapped status is represented by turning the card 90 degrees to the right.

On cards since Revised edition (1994), tapping has been represented by a symbol, though this is not unique to the game of Magic: The Gathering.  was filed by Wizards of the Coast to patent the mechanics of some aspects of collectible card games, including tapping. The patent expired on June 22 2014.

Mechanics similar to tapping are used in other card and board games, often involving the same 90 degree card rotation.  For example, this act is referred to as setting in Ophidian 2350, committing in the Universal Fighting System and spending in Gloomhaven.  In the medieval-Japan-themed Legend of the Five Rings, the mechanism is called "bowing".  A few games, such as the City of Heroes Collectible Card Game, use several different rotational increments (90, 180, and 270 degrees), each denoting a different card status.

References

Collectible card games
Game terminology
Video game terminology